Ondřejov may refer to places in the Czech Republic:

Ondřejov (Pelhřimov District), a municipality and village in the Vysočina Region
Ondřejov (Prague-East District), a municipality and village in the Central Bohemian Region
Ondřejov Observatory, an observatory in the municipality
Ondřejov, a village and part of Perštejn in the Ústí nad Labem Region
Ondřejov, a village and part of Pláně in the Plzeň Region
Ondřejov, a village and part of Rýmařov in the Moravian-Silesian Region